South Chadderton is a tram stop on the Oldham and Rochdale Line (ORL) of Greater Manchester's light-rail Metrolink system. It opened to passengers on 13 June 2012 and is located between Drury Lane and Stanley Road in the Coalshaw Green area of southern Chadderton, a part of the Metropolitan Borough of Oldham, England. It was purpose-built for Metrolink as part of Phase 3a of the system's expansion, on the route of the former Oldham Loop Line.

Service pattern 

Connecting bus routes
South Chadderton station is served by First Greater Manchester services 81 and 81A, which stop nearby on Coalshaw Green Road. The services run northbound to Oldham before continuing to Derker (81) or Holts Estate via Waterhead (81A), while southbound, the 81 and 81A run to Manchester via Moston.

References

External links
 https://web.archive.org/web/20120211143030/http://www.lrta.org/Manchester/Oldham_Rochdale.html
Metrolink stop information
South Chadderton area map

Tram stops in the Metropolitan Borough of Oldham
Tram stops on the East Didsbury to Rochdale line
Chadderton